Aten is an unincorporated community and census-designated place in Cedar County, Nebraska, United States. As of the 2010 census it had a population of 112.

Geography
Aten is located in northwestern Cedar County, bordered by the Missouri River and the state of South Dakota to the north.

History
Aten was founded in 1881 and named for postmaster John Aten. A post office was established in Aten in 1882, and remained in operation until it was discontinued in 1906.

Demographics

References

Census-designated places in Cedar County, Nebraska
Census-designated places in Nebraska